Diocese of Coimbatore may refer to:

 Anglican Diocese of Coimbatore
 Roman Catholic Diocese of Coimbatore